The Kulchabat, Bala Karz and Mushkizi massacre was an alleged war crime reportedly perpetrated by the Soviet Army on 12 October 1983 in the villages of Kulchabat, Bala Karz and Mushkizi in the Kandahar Province, Afghanistan, during the Soviet–Afghan War. Reports indicate that up to 360 people were gathered at the three village squares and shot, including 20 girls and over a dozen older people.

According to a Human Rights Watch report, based on eyewitness testimonies, the said three villages were situated along a road between Kandahar and the Soviet military base at Mandisar airport. On 10 and 11 October, the Jamiat-e Islami resistance members attacked and destroyed several Soviet military vehicles in a convoy. Allegedly, seven tanks were destroyed. They were setting up military outposts around Kandahar. As a revenge, the Soviet Army and an Afghan collaborator who served as their interpreter went to Kulchabat, Bala Karz and Mushkizi villages, suspected of sheltering the guerilla fighters, and went from house to house, shooting people living there. In one house, they locked women and children inside a room and killed them by throwing grenandes through the window, bayonetting any survivors. Their estimate is around 100 fatalities in Mushkizi and Bala Karz, as well as 160 to 170 fatalities in Kulchabat. A witness testified:

See also
Soviet war crimes
Laghman massacre 
Rauzdi massacre

References

Soviet war crimes
Massacres committed by the Soviet Union
Crimes against humanity
Soviet–Afghan War
1983 in Afghanistan
Massacres in Afghanistan